The executive branch of the national government of South Africa is divided into the cabinet and the civil service, as in the Westminster system. Public administration, the day-to-day implementation of legislation and policy, is managed by government departments (including state agencies with department status), which are usually headed by permanent civil servants with the title of director-general.

Each department also has a political head, a cabinet minister, who is appointed by the president and who has ultimate oversight over and political responsibility for that department. A ministerial portfolio often includes more than one department. Even when the relationship between ministers and departments is one-to-one, the ministry is not coterminous with the department: they are legislatively and operationally distinct. The ministry usually consists of the minister, one or more deputy ministers, and a small number of advisors and other ministerial staff. According to Section 85 of the Constitution, ultimate executive authority in South Africa is vested in the president and exercised by the cabinet.

Current departments

The following list shows the departments as they have been since June 2019, when President Cyril Ramaphosa announced a reconfiguration of departments.

History

Deputy presidents 
During the Government of National Unity (GNU) after the 1994 election, the Office of the Executive Deputy President and the Office of the Executive Deputy President from the Largest Minority Party were established as separate departments. The latter was abolished after the National Party pulled out of the GNU in 1996, and the former was abolished after the 1999 election which terminated the GNU.

Restructuring 
The following is a list of former departments which were dissolved in mergers or divisions, especially during major restructurings in 2009 and 2019:

New departments 
Presidents may also create new departments. In 2009, the Department of Women, Children and People with Disabilities (later the Department of Women, Youth and Persons with Disabilities) with Disabilities was created. Later that year (after the Department of Defence had briefly been renamed the Department of Defence and Military Veterans), the Department of Military Veterans was created. And, in 2014, the Department of Small Business Development was created.

See also 

 Cabinet of South Africa

References